Andriy Bandrivskyi (born 9 March 1985) is a professional Ukrainian football goalkeeper who plays for FC Ukraine United in the Canadian Soccer League.

Playing career

Ukraine 
Bandrivskyi played in the Ukrainian Second League with FC Karpaty-3 Lviv in 2002, and later with FC Karpaty-2 Lviv in 2004. In 2005, he had stints with FC Zhytychi Zhytomyr, and later with FC Hirnyk Kryvyi Rih . After several seasons in the Ukrainian Second League he ultimately in 2008 played in the Ukrainian Premier League with FC Lviv. The following season he played with FC Arsenal Bila Tserkva, and later in the Ukrainian First League with FC Enerhetyk Burshtyn in 2009. He later played in the Ukrainian Football Amateur League with FC Sambir, FC Rukh Vynnyky, and SCC Demnya.

Canada 
In 2018, he played abroad in the Canadian Soccer League with FC Ukraine United. In his debut season in Toronto he assisted in securing the First Division title. In his sophomore season he participated in the CSL Championship final against Scarborough SC, but in a losing effort.

References  

1985 births
Living people
Ukrainian footballers
FC Lviv players
Association football goalkeepers
FC Karpaty-3 Lviv players
FC Karpaty-2 Lviv players
FC Zhytychi Zhytomyr players
FC Hirnyk Kryvyi Rih players
FC Arsenal-Kyivshchyna Bila Tserkva players
FC Enerhetyk Burshtyn players
FC Sambir players
FC Rukh Lviv players
SCC Demnya players
FC Ukraine United players
Ukrainian Premier League players
Ukrainian First League players
Canadian Soccer League (1998–present) players
Ukrainian Second League players